The 1993–94 All-Ireland Senior Club Football Championship was the 24th staging of the All-Ireland Senior Club Football Championship since its establishment by the Gaelic Athletic Association in 1970-71. The championship began on 3 October 1993 and ended on 17 March 1994.

O'Donovan Rossa were the defending champions, however, they failed to qualify after being beaten by Nemo Rangers in the quarter-final of the 1993 Cork County Championship.

On 17 March 1994, Nemo Rangers won the championship following a 3-11 to 0-08 defeat of Castlebar Mitchels in the All-Ireland final at Croke Park. It was their sixth championship title overall and their first title since 1989.

Nemo Rangers' Colin Corkery was the championship's top scorer with 2-26.

Results

Connacht Senior Club Football Championship

Quarter-final

Semi-finals

Finals

Leinster Senior Club Football Championship

First round

Quarter-finals

Semi-finals

Final

Munster Senior Club Football Championship

First round

Semi-finals

Final

Ulster Senior Club Football Championship

Preliminary round

Quarter-finals

Semi-finals

Final

All-Ireland Senior Club Football Championship

Quarter-final

Semi-finals

Final

Championship statistics

Top scorers

Overall

In a single game

Miscellaneous

 Errigal Ciarán won the Ulster Club Championship for the first time in their history. They were also the first team from Tyrone to win the provincial title.

References

1993 in Gaelic football
1994 in Gaelic football